Orkney, also known as the Orkney Islands, is an archipelago in the Northern Isles of Scotland, situated off the north coast of the island of Great Britain. Orkney is 10 miles (16 km) north of the coast of Caithness and has about 70 islands, of which 20 are inhabited. Orkney’s largest settlement, and also its administrative centre, is Kirkwall.

Orkney is one of the 32 council areas of Scotland, as well as a constituency of the Scottish Parliament, a lieutenancy area, and an historic county. The local council is Orkney Islands Council, one of only three councils in Scotland with a majority of elected members who are independents.

The islands have been inhabited for at least  years, originally occupied by Mesolithic and Neolithic tribes and then by the Picts. Orkney was colonized and later annexed by the Kingdom of Norway in 875 and settled by the Norsemen. In 1472, the Parliament of Scotland absorbed the Earldom of Orkney into the Kingdom of Scotland, following failure to pay a dowry promised to James III of Scotland by the family of his bride, Margaret of Denmark.

In addition to the Mainland, most of the remaining islands are divided into two groups: the North Isles and the South Isles. The climate is relatively mild and the soils are extremely fertile; most of the land is farmed, and agriculture is the most important sector of the economy. The significant wind and marine energy resources are of growing importance; the amount of electricity that Orkney generates annually from renewable energy sources exceeds its demand.

The local people are known as Orcadians; they speak a distinctive dialect of the Scots language and have a rich body of folklore. Orkney contains some of the oldest and best-preserved Neolithic sites in Europe; the "Heart of Neolithic Orkney" is a designated UNESCO World Heritage Site. Orkney also has an abundance of marine and avian wildlife.

Etymology
Pytheas of Massilia visited Britain – probably sometime between 322 and 285 BC – and described it as triangular in shape, with a northern tip called Orcas.
This may have referred to Dunnet Head, from which Orkney is visible. Writing in the 1st century AD, the Roman geographers Ptolemy and Pomponius Mela called the islands  (Όρκάδες), as did Tacitus in 98 AD, claiming that his father-in-law Agricola had "discovered and subjugated the Orcades hitherto unknown" (although both Mela and Pliny had previously referred to the islands). The Byzantine John Tzetzes in his work Chiliades is calling the islands as Orcades.

Etymologists usually interpret the element  as a Pictish tribal name meaning "young pig" or "young boar". Speakers of Old Irish referred to the islands as  "islands of the young pigs". Some earlier sources alternatively hypothesise that Orkney comes from the Latin , whale.

Norwegian settlers arriving from the late ninth century reinterpreted orc as the Old Norse  "seal" and added  "islands" to the end, so the name became  "Seal Islands". The plural suffix  was later removed in English leaving the modern name Orkney.

The Norse knew Mainland, Orkney as  "Mainland" or as  "Horse Island". The island is sometimes referred to as Pomona (or Pomonia), a name that stems from a 16th-century mistranslation by George Buchanan, which has rarely been used locally.

History

Prehistory

A charred hazelnut shell, recovered in 2007 during excavations in Tankerness on the Mainland, has been dated to 6820–6660 BC, indicating the presence of Mesolithic nomadic tribes. The earliest known permanent settlement is at Knap of Howar, a Neolithic farmstead on the island of Papa Westray, which dates from 3500 BC. The village of Skara Brae, Europe's best-preserved Neolithic settlement, is believed to have been inhabited from around 3100 BC. Other remains from that era include the Standing Stones of Stenness, the Maeshowe passage grave, the Ring of Brodgar and other standing stones. Many of the Neolithic settlements were abandoned around 2500 BC, possibly due to changes in the climate.

In September 2021, archaeologists announced the discovery of two polished stone balls in a 5500-year-old Neolithic burial tomb in Sanday. According to Dr Hugo Anderson, the second object was as the “size of a cricket ball, perfectly spherical and beautifully finished". 

During the Bronze Age, fewer large stone structures were built (although the great ceremonial circles continued in use) as metalworking was slowly introduced to Britain from Europe over a lengthy period. There are relatively few Orcadian sites dating from this era although there is the impressive Plumcake Mound near the Ring of Brodgar and various island sites such as Tofts Ness on Sanday and the remains of two houses on Holm of Faray.

Iron Age

Excavations at Quanterness on the Mainland have revealed an Atlantic roundhouse built about 700 BC and similar finds have been made at Bu on the Mainland and Pierowall Quarry on Westray. The most impressive Iron Age structures of Orkney are the ruins of later round towers called "brochs" and their associated settlements such as the Broch of Burroughston and Broch of Gurness. The nature and origin of these buildings is a subject of debate. Other structures from this period include underground storehouses, and aisled roundhouses, the latter usually in association with earlier broch sites.

During the Roman invasion of Britain the "King of Orkney" was one of 11 British leaders who is said to have submitted to the Emperor Claudius in AD 43 at Camulodunum (modern Colchester). After the Agricolan fleet had come and gone, possibly anchoring at Shapinsay, direct Roman influence seems to have been limited to trade rather than conquest.
Polemius Silvius wrote a list of Late Roman provinces, which Seeck appended to his edition of the Notitia Dignitatum. The list names six provinces in Roman Britannia: the sixth is the dubious "Orcades provincia", the possible existence of which recent researches re-evaluate.

By the late Iron Age, Orkney was part of the Pictish kingdom, and although the archaeological remains from this period are less impressive, the fertile soils and rich seas of Orkney probably provided the Picts with a comfortable living. The Dalriadic Gaels began to influence the islands towards the close of the Pictish era, perhaps principally through the role of Celtic missionaries, as evidenced by several islands bearing the epithet "Papa" in commemoration of these preachers. Before the Gaelic presence could establish itself the Picts were gradually dispossessed by the North Germanic peoples from the late 8th century onwards. The nature of this transition is controversial, and theories range from peaceful integration to enslavement and genocide. It has been suggested that an assault by forces from Fortriu in 681 in which Orkney was "annihilated" may have led to a weakening of the local power base and helped the Norse come to prominence.

Norwegian rule

Both Orkney and Shetland saw a significant influx of Norwegian settlers during the late 8th and early 9th centuries. Vikings made the islands the headquarters of their pirate expeditions carried out against Norway and the coasts of mainland Scotland. In response, Norwegian king Harald Fairhair (Harald Hårfagre) annexed the Northern Isles, comprising Orkney and Shetland, in 875 (it is clear that this story, which appears in the Orkneyinga Saga, is based on the later voyages of Magnus Barelegs and some scholars believe it to be apocryphal). Rognvald Eysteinsson received Orkney and Shetland from Harald as an earldom as reparation for the death of his son in battle in Scotland, and then passed the earldom on to his brother Sigurd the Mighty.

However, Sigurd's line barely survived him and it was Torf-Einarr, Rognvald's son by a slave, who founded a dynasty that controlled the islands for centuries after his death. He was succeeded by his son Thorfinn Skull-splitter and during this time the deposed Norwegian King Eric Bloodaxe often used Orkney as a raiding base before being killed in 954. Thorfinn's death and presumed burial at the broch of Hoxa, on South Ronaldsay, led to a long period of dynastic strife.

Initially a pagan culture, detailed information about the turn to the Christian religion to the islands of Scotland during the Norse era is elusive. The  Orkneyinga Saga suggests the islands were Christianised by Olaf Tryggvasson in 995 when he stopped at South Walls on his way from Ireland to Norway. The King summoned the jarl Sigurd the Stout and said, "I order you and all your subjects to be baptised. If you refuse, I'll have you killed on the spot and I swear I will ravage every island with fire and steel." Unsurprisingly, Sigurd agreed and the islands became Christian at a stroke, receiving their own bishop in the early 11th century.

Thorfinn the Mighty was a son of Sigurd and a grandson of King Malcolm II of Scotland (Máel Coluim mac Cináeda). Along with Sigurd's other sons he ruled Orkney during the first half of the 11th century and extended his authority over a small maritime empire stretching from Dublin to Shetland. Thorfinn died around 1065 and his sons Paul and Erlend succeeded him, fighting at the Battle of Stamford Bridge in 1066. Paul and Erlend quarreled as adults and this dispute carried on to the next generation. The martyrdom of Magnus Erlendsson, who was killed in April 1116 by his cousin Haakon Paulsson, resulted in the building of St. Magnus Cathedral, still today a dominating feature of Kirkwall.

Unusually, from c. 1100 onwards the Norse jarls owed allegiance both to Norway for Orkney and to the Scottish crown through their holdings as Earls of Caithness. In 1231 the line of Norse earls, unbroken since Rognvald, ended with Jon Haraldsson's murder in Thurso. The Earldom of Caithness was granted to Magnus, second son of the Earl of Angus, whom Haakon IV of Norway confirmed as Earl of Orkney in 1236. In 1290, the death of the child princess Margaret, Maid of Norway in Orkney, en route to mainland Scotland, created a disputed succession that led to the Wars of Scottish Independence. In 1379 the earldom passed to the Sinclair family, who were also barons of Roslin near Edinburgh.

Evidence of the Viking presence is widespread, and includes the settlement at the Brough of Birsay, the vast majority of place names, and the runic inscriptions at Maeshowe.

Absorption by Scotland

In 1468 Orkney was pledged by Christian I, in his capacity as King of Norway, as security against the payment of the dowry of his daughter Margaret, betrothed to James III of Scotland. However the money was never paid, and Orkney was absorbed by the Kingdom of Scotland in 1472. 

The history of Orkney prior to this time is largely the history of the ruling aristocracy. From now on ordinary people emerge with greater clarity. An influx of Scottish entrepreneurs helped to create a diverse and independent community that included farmers, fishermen and merchants that called themselves comunitas Orcadie and who proved themselves increasingly able to defend their rights against their feudal overlords.

From at least the 16th century, boats from mainland Scotland and the Netherlands dominated the local herring fishery. There is little evidence of an Orcadian fleet until the 19th century but it grew rapidly and 700 boats were involved by the 1840s with Stronsay and later Stromness becoming leading centres of development. White fish never became as dominant as in other Scottish ports.

Agricultural improvements beginning in the 17th century resulted in the enclosure of the commons and ultimately in the Victoria era the emergence of large and well-managed farms using a five-shift rotation system and producing high-quality beef cattle.

In the 17th century, Orcadians formed the overwhelming majority of employees of the Hudson's Bay Company in Canada. The harsh winter weather of Orkney and the Orcadian reputation for sobriety and their boat handling skills made them ideal candidates for the rigours of the Canadian north. During this period, burning kelp briefly became a mainstay of the islands' economy. The industry collapsed suddenly in 1830 after the removal of tariffs on imported alkali.

During the 18th century Jacobite risings, Orkney was largely Jacobite in its sympathies. At the end of the 1715 rebellion, a large number of Jacobites who had fled north from mainland Scotland sought refuge in Orkney and were helped on to safety in Sweden. In 1745, the Jacobite lairds on the islands ensured that Orkney remained pro-Jacobite in outlook, and was a safe place to land supplies from Spain to aid their cause. Orkney was the last place in the British Isles that held out for the Jacobites and was not retaken by the British Government until 24 May 1746, over a month after the defeat of the main Jacobite army at Culloden.

20th century

Orkney was the site of a Royal Navy base at Scapa Flow, which played a major role in World War I and World War II. After the Armistice in 1918, the German High Seas Fleet was transferred in its entirety to Scapa Flow to await a decision on its future. The German sailors opened the seacocks and scuttled all the ships. Most ships were salvaged, but the remaining wrecks are now a favoured haunt of recreational divers. One month into World War II, a German U-boat sank the Royal Navy battleship  in Scapa Flow. As a result, barriers were built to close most of the access channels; these had the additional advantage of creating causeways enabling travellers to go from island to island by road instead of being obliged to rely on ferries. The causeways were constructed by Italian prisoners of war, who also constructed the ornate Italian Chapel.

The navy base became run down after the war, eventually closing in 1957. The problem of a declining population was significant in the post-war years, though in the last decades of the 20th century there was a recovery and life in Orkney focused on growing prosperity and the emergence of a relatively classless society. Orkney was rated as the best place to live in Scotland in both 2013 and 2014, and in 2019 the best place to live in the UK, according to the Halifax Quality of Life survey.

Overview of population trends
In the modern era, population peaked in the mid 19th century at just over 32,000 and declined for a century thereafter to a low of fewer than 18,000 in the 1970s. Declines were particularly significant in the outlying islands, some of which remain vulnerable to ongoing losses. Although Orkney is in many ways very distinct from the other islands and archipelagos of Scotland these trends are very similar to those experienced elsewhere. The archipelago's population grew by 11% in the decade to 2011 as recorded by the census. During the same period Scottish island populations as a whole grew by 4% to 103,702.

Geography

Orkney is separated from the mainland of Scotland by the Pentland Firth, a  seaway between Brough Ness on the island of South Ronaldsay and Duncansby Head in Caithness.

Orkney is separated from the Shetland Islands, a group farther out, by a body of water called the Fair Isle Channel.

The islands are mainly low-lying except for some sharply rising sandstone hills on Mainland, Rousay and Hoy (where the tallest point in Orkney, Ward Hill, can be found) and rugged cliffs on some western coasts. Nearly all of the islands have lochs, but the watercourses are merely streams draining the high land. The coastlines are indented, and the islands themselves are divided from each other by straits generally called "sounds" or "firths".

The tidal currents, or "roosts" as some of them are called locally, off many of the isles are swift, with frequent whirlpools. The islands are notable for the absence of trees, which is partly accounted for by the strong winds.

Administration

The Local Government (Scotland) Act 1889 established a uniform system of county councils in Scotland and realigned the boundaries of many of Scotland's counties. Subsequently, Orkney County Council was created in 1890. Orkney County Council was based at the County Buildings in Watergate in Kirkwall.

Orkney is now administered by the Orkney Islands Council, a unitary island council created in the Scottish local government re-organization in 1975. In that year Scotland’s civil parishes were replaced by Community Council Areas, which had an advisory, rather than an administrative role. Orkney’s parishes were replaced by 20 CCA’s covering 34 rural settlements. Ten of these CCA’s were formed on Mainland, replacing 13 civil parish and two burgh councils.

The original civil parishes were as follows:

 Birsay and Harray (united in the 19th century)
 Cross and Burness (united at an unknown date)
 Eday
 Evie and Rendall (united in the 16th century)
 Firth
 Holm
 Hoy & Graemsay
 Kirkwall & St Ola
 Lady
 Orphir
 Papa Westray
 Rousay & Egilsay
 Sandwick
 Shapinsay
 South Ronaldsay and Burray (union of ancient parishes of St Mary's, St Peter's, and Burray)
 St Andrews and Deerness (united at an unknown date)
 Stenness
 Stromness
 Stronsay (union of ancient parishes of Lady, St Nicholas, and Stronsay St Peter's)
 Walls and Flotta (united at an unknown date)
 Westray

Demographics
Genetic studies have shown that 25% of the gene pool of Orkney derives from Norwegian ancestors who occupied the islands in the 9th century.

Islands

The Mainland

The Mainland is the largest island of Orkney. Both of Orkney's burghs, Kirkwall and Stromness, are on this island, which is also the heart of Orkney's transport system, with ferry and air connections to the other islands and to the outside world. The island is more heavily populated (75% of Orkney's population) than the other islands and has much fertile farmland. The Mainland is split into areas called East and West Mainland. These areas are determined by whether they lie east or west of Kirkwall. The bulk of the mainland lies west of Kirkwall, with comparatively little land east of Kirkwall.
West Mainland parishes are:
Stromness, Sandwick, Birsay, Harray, Stenness, Orphir, Evie, Rendall and Firth.
East Mainland Parishes are:
St Ola, Tankerness, St Andrews, Holm and Deerness.

The island is mostly low-lying (especially East Mainland) but with coastal cliffs to the north and west and two sizeable lochs: the Loch of Harray and the Loch of Stenness. The Mainland contains the remnants of numerous Neolithic, Pictish and Viking constructions. Four of the main Neolithic sites are included in the Heart of Neolithic Orkney World Heritage Site, inscribed in 1999.

The other islands in the group are classified as north or south of the Mainland. In island names, the suffix "a" or "ay" represents the Norse ey, meaning "island". Those described as "holms" are very small.

The North Isles

The northern group of islands is the most extensive and consists of a large number of moderately sized islands, linked to the Mainland by ferries and by air services. Farming, fishing and tourism are the main sources of income for most of the islands.

The most northerly is North Ronaldsay, which lies  beyond its nearest neighbour, Sanday. To the west is Westray, which has a population of 550. It is connected by ferry and air to Papa Westray, also known as "Papay". Eday is at the centre of the North Isles. The centre of the island is moorland and the island's main industries have been peat extraction and limestone quarrying.

Rousay, Egilsay and Gairsay lie north of the west Mainland across the Eynhallow Sound. Rousay is well known for its ancient monuments, including the Quoyness chambered cairn and Egilsay has the ruins of the only round-towered church in Orkney. Wyre to the south-east contains the site of Cubbie Roo's castle. Stronsay and Papa Stronsay lie much further to the east across the Stronsay Firth. Auskerry is south of Stronsay and has a population of only five. Shapinsay and its Balfour Castle are a short distance north of Kirkwall.

Other small uninhabited islands in the North Isles group include Calf of Eday, Damsay, Eynhallow, Faray, Helliar Holm, Holm of Faray, Holm of Huip, Holm of Papa, Holm of Scockness, Kili Holm, Linga Holm, Muckle Green Holm, Rusk Holm and Sweyn Holm.

The South Isles

The southern group of islands surrounds Scapa Flow. Hoy, to the west, is the second largest of the Orkney Isles and Ward Hill at its northern end is the highest elevation in the archipelago. The Old Man of Hoy is a well-known seastack. Graemsay and Flotta are both linked by ferry to the Mainland and Hoy, and the latter is known for its large oil terminal. South Walls has a 19th-century Martello tower and is connected to Hoy by the Ayre. 
Burray lies to the east of Scapa Flow and is linked by causeway to South Ronaldsay, which hosts cultural events such as the Festival of the Horse and the Boys' Ploughing Match on the third Saturday in August. It is also the location of the Neolithic Tomb of the Eagles. South Ronaldsay, Burray, Glimps Holm, and Lamb Holm are connected by road to the Mainland by the Churchill Barriers.

Uninhabited South Islands include Calf of Flotta, Cava, Copinsay, Corn Holm, Fara, Glimps Holm, Hunda, Lamb Holm, Rysa Little, Switha and Swona. The Pentland Skerries lie further south, closer to the Scottish mainland.

Geology

The superficial rock of Orkney is almost entirely Old Red Sandstone, mostly of Middle Devonian age. As in the neighbouring mainland county of Caithness, this sandstone rests upon the metamorphic rocks of the Moine series, as may be seen on the Mainland, where a narrow strip is exposed between Stromness and Inganess, and again in the small island of Graemsay; they are represented by grey gneiss and granite.

The Middle Devonian is divided into three main groups. The lower part of the sequence, mostly Eifelian in age, is dominated by lacustrine beds of the lower and upper Stromness Flagstones that were deposited in Lake Orcadie. The later Rousay flagstone formation is found throughout much of the North and South Isles and East Mainland.

It lies unconformably upon steeply inclined flagstones, the interpretation of which is a matter of continuing debate.

The Devonian and older rocks of Orkney are cut by a series of WSW–ENE to N–S trending faults, many of which were active during deposition of the Devonian sequences. A strong synclinal fold traverses Eday and Shapinsay, the axis trending north-south.

Middle Devonian basaltic volcanic rocks are found on western Hoy, on Deerness in eastern Mainland and on Shapinsay. Correlation between the Hoy volcanics and the other two exposures has been proposed, but differences in chemistry mean this remains uncertain. Lamprophyre dykes of Late Permian age are found throughout Orkney.

Glacial striation and the presence of chalk and flint erratics that originated from the bed of the North Sea demonstrate the influence of ice action on the geomorphology of the islands. Boulder clay is also abundant and moraines cover substantial areas.

Climate
Orkney has a cool temperate climate that is remarkably mild and steady for such a northerly latitude, due to the influence of the warm waters of the Norwegian Current, a north-easterly extension of the North Atlantic Drift which is itself an extension of the Gulf Stream.

Winds are a key feature of the climate and even in summer there are almost constant breezes. In winter, there are frequent strong winds, with an average of 52 hours of gales being recorded annually.

To tourists, one of the fascinations of the islands is their "nightless" summers. On the longest day, the sun rises at 04:00 and sets at 22:29 BST and complete darkness is unknown. This long twilight is known in the Northern Isles as the "simmer dim". Winter nights are long. On the shortest day the sun rises at 09:05 and sets at 15:16. At this time of year the aurora borealis can occasionally be seen on the northern horizon during moderate auroral activity.

The first averages table below is for the largest settlement Kirkwall's weather station, the second is for the Loch of Hundland, a rural location to the northwest of Mainland Orkney.

Politics
Orkney is represented in the House of Commons as part of the Orkney and Shetland constituency, which elects one Member of Parliament (MP), the current incumbent being Alistair Carmichael. This seat has been held by the Liberal Democrats or the former Liberal Party since 1950, longer than any other they represent in Great Britain.

In the Scottish Parliament the Orkney constituency elects one Member of the Scottish Parliament (MSP) by the first past the post system. The current MSP is Liam McArthur of the Liberal Democrats. Before McArthur the MSP was Jim Wallace, who was previously Deputy First Minister. Orkney is within the Highlands and Islands electoral region.

Orkney Islands Council consists of 21 members, 18 of whom are independent, that is they do not stand as representatives of a political party. Two councillors are members of the indigenous Orkney Manifesto Group, and the remaining councillor represents the Scottish Greens.

The Orkney Movement, a political party that supported devolution for Orkney from the rest of Scotland, contested the 1987 general election as the Orkney and Shetland Movement (a coalition of the Orkney movement and its equivalent for Shetland). The Scottish National Party chose not to contest the seat to give the movement a "free run". Their candidate, John Goodlad, came 4th with 3,095 votes, 14.5% of those cast, but the experiment has not been repeated.

In the 2014 Scottish independence referendum 67.2% of voters in Orkney voted no to the question "Should Scotland be an independent country?" This was the highest no vote by percentage in any council area in Scotland. Turnout for the referendum was at 83.7% in Orkney with 10,004 votes cast in the area against independence by comparison to 4,883 votes for independence.

In the 2016 United Kingdom European Union membership referendum 63.2% of voters in Orkney voted Remain.

In 2022, as part of the Levelling Up White Paper, an "Island Forum" was proposed, which would allow local policymakers and residents in Orkney to work alongside their counterparts in Shetland, the Western Isles, Anglesey and the Isle of Wight on common issues, such as broadband connectivity, and provide a platform for them to communicate directly with the government on the challenges island communities face in terms of levelling up.

Economy
The soil of Orkney is generally very fertile and most of the land is taken up by farms, agriculture being by far the most important sector of the economy and providing employment for a quarter of the workforce according to a 2008 report. More than 90% of agricultural land is used for grazing for sheep and cattle, with cereal production utilising about 4% and woodland occupying only .

Fishing has declined in importance, but still employed 345 individuals in 2001, about 3.5% of the islands' economically active population, the modern industry concentrating on herring, white fish, lobsters, crabs and other shellfish, and salmon fish farming.

A 2009 report indicated the traditional sectors of the economy export beef, cheese, whisky, beer, fish and other seafood. In recent years there has been growth in other areas including tourism, food and beverage manufacture, jewellery, knitwear, and other crafts production, construction and oil transportation through the Flotta oil terminal. Retailing accounts for 17.5% of total employment, and public services also play a significant role, employing a third of the islands' workforce. There are two Scotch whisky distilleries in Orkney (Scapa distillery and the Highland Park distillery).

In 2007, of the 1,420 VAT registered enterprises 55% were in agriculture, forestry and fishing, 12% in manufacturing and construction, 12% in wholesale, retail and repairs, and 5% in hotels and restaurants. A further 5% were public service related. 55% of these businesses employ between 5 and 49 people.

A new report, published in September 2020, provided updates about several significant aspects of the economy: there are around 1,500 businesses on the island. More than 90% have fewer than 10 employees. [Estimates indicate] 11,000 jobs, of which around 5,000 are part-time ... There's not much manufacturing, beyond food and drink processing (think cheese and whisky), and apart from the Flotta oil terminal, it lacks big private employers ... Fisheries off Orkney are only half as important to employment as in Shetland, and farming is roughly twice as important.

The report expressed concern about the loss of business caused by the worldwide COVID-19 pandemic: "blighting business activity, travel and tourism". On 1 February 2021, a new plan (subsequent to previous funding schemes) from the Scottish government was announced. The Island Equivalent Payment Fund was designed to "provide the equivalent of Level 4 support to eligible businesses in Orkney and other island areas".

Tourism

A report published in February 2020 stated that spending by visitors increased from £49.5 million in 2017 to £67.1 million in 2019, making this a significant sector of the economy. The primary attractions that encourage tourism include the "Heart of Neolithic Orkney" on the main island, defined as "a group of 5,000-year-old sites that include the preserved village of Skara Brae and the Ring of Brodgar stone circle". The Hoy area's landscape is also attractive to visitors, "with its scattered woodland, steep valleys, high cliffs and the famous Old Man, a withered red sandstone sea stack". In 2017, 62% of tourists to Orkney visited for its heritage. The UHI Archaeology Institute have led excavations at the Ness of Brodgar, contributing to tourism to the area and driving interest in archaeology.

During most years, the islands are the home of several international festivals, including the Orkney International Science Festival in September, a folk festival in May, and the St Magnus International Arts Festival in June.
 
The volume of visitors arriving on ferries declined substantially in 2020, by 71%, 
due to the COVID-19 pandemic. A news report added that cruise ships also did not arrive and there were "no day trippers and no holiday lets" as of 25 April 2020. Several major events were cancelled: St Magnus Festival, Orkney Folk Festival, Stromness Shopping Week and the Agricultural Shows.

Power

Orkney has significant wind and marine energy resources, and renewable energy has recently come into prominence. Although Orkney is connected to the mainland, it generates over 100% of its net power from renewables according to a 2015 report. This comes mainly from wind turbines situated across Orkney.

The European Marine Energy Centre (EMEC) is a research facility operating a grid-connected wave test site at Billia Croo, off the west coast of the Orkney Mainland, and a tidal power test site in the Fall of Warness, off the northern island of Eday. At the official opening of the Eday project the site was described as "the first of its kind in the world set up to provide developers of wave and tidal energy devices with a purpose-built performance testing facility."

During 2007 Scottish and Southern Energy plc in conjunction with the University of Strathclyde began the implementation of a Regional Power Zone in the Orkney archipelago, involving "active network management" that will make better use of existing infrastructure and allow a further 15 MW of new "non-firm generation" output from renewables onto the network. 1.5 MW of polymer electrolyte membrane electrolysis form a partial hydrogen economy for hydrogen vehicles and district heating, and grid batteries and electric vehicles also use local energy.

Orkney has one of the highest uptakes of electric vehicles in the UK with more than 2% of the vehicles on the road being electric, as of 2019.

Hydrogen manufacturing

A March 2019 report by the BBC stated that "Orkney creates more clean electricity than its inhabitants need. Even after exporting to the UK national grid, the islands' winds, waves and tides generate about 130% of the electricity its population needs – all of it from clean sources". A report about sustainable energy in the islands listed two options. A new cable could be laid for exporting of energy to the mainland but another proposal has progressed rapidly since that time: making "excess renewable power into another fuel – such as hydrogen – and then [storing] it".

In May 2020, CNN published more specific information about the hydrogen plan:"Orkney's success in creating hydrogen using clean energy demonstrates that it can be done at scale. The islands are already using hydrogen to power vehicles, and it will soon be used to heat a local primary school. Now, Orkney is hoping to use hydrogen fuel cells to power a seagoing vessel able to transport both goods and passengers".

Additional specific information about the status of the hydrogen scheme was published in late November 2020 by Orkney Islands Council. A few weeks earlier, another report indicated that the world’s first hydrogen-fueled ferry was to be tested on the Orkney Islands, using "a hydrogen/diesel dual fuel conversion system", developed by a consortium known as the HyDIME project. Initially hydrogen was to power only the auxiliary engine but the plan calls for later using this fuel for the primary engine. The report suggested that, "if all goes well, hydrogen ferries could be sailing between Orkney’s islands within six months".

Kirkwall Airport in Orkney was scheduled "to have its heat and power decarbonised through green hydrogen as part of a new project" starting in 2021. A hydrogen combustion engine system was to be connected to the airport’s heating system. The scheme planned to reduce the significant emissions that were created with older technology that heated buildings and water. This was part of the plan formulated by the Scottish government for the Highlands and Islands "to become the world’s first net zero aviation region by 2040".

Hydrogen manufacturing is also planned for Shetland and will spread to other areas of Scotland that have access to clean electricity. To achieve that goal, the government announced an investment of £100 million in the hydrogen sector "for the £180 million Emerging Energy Technologies Fund".

Transport

Air
Highland and Islands Airports operates the main airport in Orkney, Kirkwall Airport. Loganair provides services to the Scottish mainland (Aberdeen, Edinburgh, Glasgow and Inverness), as well as to Sumburgh Airport in Shetland.

Within Orkney, the council operates airports on most of the larger islands including Stronsay, Eday, North Ronaldsay, Westray, Papa Westray, Sanday, and Flotta. The shortest scheduled air service in the world, between the islands of Westray and Papa Westray, is scheduled at two minutes' duration but can take less than one minute if the wind is in the right direction.

Ferry

Ferries serve both to link Orkney to the rest of Scotland, and also to link together the various islands of the Orkney archipelago. Ferry services operate between Orkney and the Scottish mainland and Shetland on the following routes:
 Gills Bay to St Margaret's Hope (operated by Pentland Ferries)
 John o' Groats to Burwick on South Ronaldsay (seasonal passenger only service, operated by John o' Groats Ferries)
 Lerwick to Kirkwall (operated by NorthLink Ferries)
 Aberdeen to Kirkwall (operated by NorthLink Ferries)
 Scrabster Harbour, Thurso to Stromness (operated by NorthLink Ferries)

Inter-island ferry services connect all the inhabited islands to Orkney Mainland, and are operated by Orkney Ferries, a company owned by Orkney Islands Council. The isles of Westray, Papa Westray (or Papay), North Ronaldsay, Sanday, Eday, Stronsay, and Shapinsay are served from Kirkwall harbour, while the northern end of Hoy and Graemsay are served from Stromness harbour, the Lyness end of Hoy, as well as Longhope on South Walls, and Flotta are served from Houton on the south of the mainland, and Rousay, Egilsay and Wyre are served from Tingwall, in the Rendall area of the Orkney mainland. As well as this, the MV Golden Mariana connects the village of Pierowall on Westray with Papa Westray - this provides a vital local service for schoolchildren on Papay as well as supplementing existing through sailings from Kirkwall.

Bus

Local buses around the Orkney Mainland, as well as across the Churchill Barriers to Burray and South Ronaldsay, are operated by Stagecoach Highlands. The main route is the X1, connecting Stromness, Stenness for Maeshowe, Finstown, Kirkwall, St Mary's, Burray, and St Margaret's Hope. There are also buses from Kirkwall via Orphir (2), and from Stromness (5) to the ferry terminal at Houton (from which inter-island ferries operate to Hoy and Flotta, from Kirkwall to Kirkwall Airport (3 & 4), Tankerness and Deerness (3), from Kirkwall and Finstown to Tingwall (from which there are ferries to Rousay, Egilsay and Wyre), Evie and Birsay, from Stromness to Kirkwall via Skara Brae, Dounby, Harray and Finstown (7), the 8 (which does a circular route to and from Kirkwall and Finstown via Stromness and the West Mainland villages, such as Marwick, Quoyloo, Dounby and Stenness), and the X10, which connects the late-night call of the NorthLink ferry to and from Aberdeen and Lerwick, at Hatston Ferry Terminal, to Kirkwall, Finstown and Stromness.

In 2021, the island's three-vehicle minibus service for disabled people was a target for hackers seeking a £1,000 ransom in cryptocurrency.

Media
Orkney is served by a weekly local newspaper, The Orcadian, published on Thursdays.

A local BBC radio station, BBC Radio Orkney, the local opt-out of BBC Radio Scotland, broadcasts twice daily, with local news and entertainment. Orkney also had a commercial radio station, The Superstation Orkney, which broadcast to Kirkwall and parts of the mainland and also to most of Caithness until its closure in November 2014. Moray Firth Radio broadcasts throughout Orkney on AM and from an FM transmitter just outside Thurso. The community radio station Caithness FM also broadcasts to Orkney.

Orkney is home to the Orkney Library and Archive, located in Kirkwall, Scotland, on the mainland. The Library service provides access to over 145,000 items. They have a wide range of fiction and non-fiction titles available for loan as well as audiobooks, maps, eBooks, music CDs, and DVDs. Orkney Library and Archive operates a Mobile Library Service that serves the rural parishes and islands of Orkney. The Mobile Library carries a wide range of books and audiobooks suitable for all ages and is completely free to use.

Language, literature, and folklore

At the beginning of recorded history, the islands were inhabited by the Picts, whose language was Brythonic. The Ogham script on the Buckquoy spindle-whorl is cited as evidence for the pre-Norse existence of Old Irish in Orkney.

After the Norse occupation, the toponymy of Orkney became almost wholly West Norse. The Norse language changed into the local Norn, which lingered until the end of the 18th century, when it eventually died out. Norn was replaced by the Orcadian dialect of Insular Scots. This dialect is at a low ebb due to the pervasive influences of television, education, and the large number of incomers. However, attempts are being made by some writers and radio presenters to revitalise its use and the distinctive sing-song accent and many dialect words of Norse origin remain in use.

Orkney has a rich folklore, and many of the former tales concern trows, an Orcadian form of troll that draws on the islands' Scandinavian connections. Local customs in the past included marriage ceremonies at the Odin Stone that formed part of the Stones of Stenness.

King Lot in certain versions of the Arthurian legend (e.g., Malory) is ruler of Orkney. His sons Gawaine, Agravaine, Gareth, and Gaheris are major characters in the Matter of Britain. In earlier versions of Arthuriana such as Geoffrey of Monmouth's History of the Kings of Britain the King of Orkney is named Gunfasius.

The best known literary figures from modern Orkney are the poet Edwin Muir, the poet and novelist George Mackay Brown, and the novelist Eric Linklater.

Orcadians

An Orcadian is a native of Orkney, a term that reflects a strongly held identity with a tradition of understatement. Although the annexation of the earldom by Scotland took place over five centuries ago in 1472, some Orcadians regard themselves as Orcadians first and Scots second. However in response to the national identity question in the 2011 Scotland Census, self-reported levels of Scottish identity in Orkney were in line with the national average.

The Scottish mainland is often referred to as "Scotland" in Orkney, with "the mainland" referring to Mainland, Orkney. The archipelago also has a distinct culture, with traditions of the Scottish Highlands such as tartan, clans, bagpipes not indigenous to the culture of the islands. However, at least two tartans with Orkney connections have been registered and a tartan has been designed for Sanday by one of the island's residents, and there are pipe bands in Orkney.

Native Orcadians refer to the non-native residents of the islands as "ferry loupers", ("loup" meaning "jump" in the Scots language) a term that has been in use for nearly two centuries at least.

Natural history

Orkney has an abundance of wildlife, especially of grey and common seals and seabirds such as puffins, kittiwakes, black guillemots (tysties), ravens, and great skuas (bonxies). Whales, dolphins, and otters are also seen around the coasts. Inland the Orkney vole, a distinct subspecies of the common vole introduced by Neolithic humans, is an endemic. There are five distinct varieties, found on the islands of Sanday, Westray, Rousay, South Ronaldsay, and the Mainland, all the more remarkable as the species is absent on mainland Britain.

The coastline is well known for its colourful flowers including sea aster, sea squill, sea thrift, common sea-lavender, bell and common heather. The Scottish primrose is found only on the coasts of Orkney and nearby Caithness and Sutherland. Although stands of trees are generally rare, a small forest named Happy Valley with 700 trees and lush gardens was created from a boggy hillside near Stenness during the second half of the 20th century.

The North Ronaldsay sheep is an unusual breed of domesticated animal, subsisting largely on a diet of seaweed, since they are confined to the foreshore for most of the year to conserve the limited grazing inland. The island was also a habitat for the Atlantic walrus until the mid-16th century.

The Orkney char (Salvelinus inframundus) used to live in Heldale Water on Hoy. It has been considered locally extinct since 1908.

Stoat problem and solution

The introduction of alien stoats since 2010, a natural predator of the common vole and thus of the Orkney vole, was also harming native bird populations. NatureScot, Scotland's Nature Agency, provided these additional specifics:The introduction of a ground predator like the stoat to islands such as Orkney, where there are no native ground predators, is very bad news for Orkney’s native species. Stoats are accomplished predators and pose a very serious threat to Orkney’s wildlife, including: the native Orkney vole, hen harrier, short-eared owl and many ground nesting birds.

In 2018, a stoat eradication project was presented by NatureScot to be applied "across Orkney Mainland, South Ronaldsay, Burray, Glimps Holm, Lamb Holm and Hunda, and the
biosecurity activities delivered on the non-linked islands of the archipelago". The Orkney Native Wildlife Project planned to use "humane DOC150 and DOC200 traps". The Partners in the five-year project include "RSPB Scotland, Scottish Natural Heritage (SNH), and Orkney Islands Council". A report issued in October 2020 stated that over 5,000 traps had been deployed. Specifics were provided as to the locations.

Not all was going well as of 15 January 2021, according to The Times which stated that the project "has been hit by alleged sabotage after the destruction and theft of traps that have also killed and injured household pets and other animals" but added that the £6 million programme was supported by most islanders. Another news item stated that some of the traps had "caught and killed family pets as well as hundreds of other animals". A subsequent report confirmed that "Police Scotland is investigating a number of incidents involving damage to and the theft of stoat traps in Orkney".

Protected areas
There are 13 Special Protection Areas and 6 Special Areas of Conservation in Orkney. One of Scotland's 40 national scenic areas, the Hoy and West Mainland National Scenic Area, is also located in the islands.

Freedom of the Island

Orkney as a whole, since 1887, has been associated specifically with and as a recruiting area of the following military units that have received the Freedom of the Island of Orkney:

 The Seaforth Highlanders, Queens Own Highlanders, The Highlanders Regiment and 4th Battalion Royal Regiment of Scotland.
 The Northern Diving Group Royal Navy: 9 July 2021.

See also

 Timeline of prehistoric Scotland
 Prehistoric Scotland
 Battle of Florvåg
 Bishop of Orkney
 Coat of arms of Orkney
 List of places in Orkney
 Orkney Club
 Orkney College
 Rögnvald Kali Kolsson
 Udal Law
 Parishes of Orkney
 Constitutional status of Orkney, Shetland and the Western Isles
 Solar eclipse of 1 May 1185
 Baha'i Faith in Orkney

References

Footnotes

Citations

General references

 Armit, Ian (2006) Scotland's Hidden History. Stroud. Tempus. 
 Beuermann, Ian "Jarla Sǫgur Orkneyja. Status and power of the earls of Orkney according to their sagas" in Steinsland, Gro; Sigurðsson, Jón Viðar; Rekda, Jan Erik and Beuermann, Ian (eds) (2011) Ideology and power in the Viking and Middle Ages: Scandinavia, Iceland, Ireland, Orkney and the Faeroes . The Northern World: North Europe and the Baltic c. 400–1700 A.D. Peoples, Economics and Cultures. 52. Leiden. Brill. 
 Baynes, John (1970) The Jacobite Rising of 1715. London. Cassell. 
 Benvie, Neil (2004) Scotland's Wildlife. London. Aurum Press. 
 Ballin Smith, B. and Banks, I. (eds) (2002) In the Shadow of the Brochs, the Iron Age in Scotland. Stroud. Tempus. 
 Ballin Smith, Beverley; Taylor, Simon; and Williams, Gareth (eds) (2007) West Over Sea: Studies in Scandinavian Sea-borne Expansion and Settlement Before 1300. Brill. 
 Clarkson, Tim (2008) The Picts: A History. Stroud. The History Press. 
 Duffy, Christopher (2003) The 45: Bonnie Prince Charlie and the Untold Story of the Jacobite Rising. London. Weidenfeld & Nicolson. 
 Fraser, James E. (2009) From Caledonia to Pictland: Scotland to 795. Edinburgh University Press. 
 
 Moffat, Alistair (2005) Before Scotland: The Story of Scotland Before History. London. Thames & Hudson. 
 Omand, Donald (ed.) (2003) The Orkney Book. Edinburgh. Birlinn. 
 Thompson, William P.L. (2008) The New History of Orkney. Edinburgh. Birlinn. 
 Whitaker's Almanack 1991 (1990). London. J. Whitaker & Sons. 
 Wickham-Jones, Caroline (2007) Orkney: A Historical Guide. Edinburgh. Birlinn.

Further reading

 Batey, C.E. et al (eds.) (1995) The Viking Age in Caithness, Orkney and the North Atlantic. Edinburgh University Press. 
 Fresson, Captain E.E. Air Road to the Isles. (2008) Kea Publishing. 
 Hutton, Guthrie (2009) Old Orkney. Catrine: Stenlake Publishing 
 Livesey, Margot, The Flight of Gemma Hardy (a novel). HarperCollins, 2012. 
 Lo Bao, Phil and Hutchison, Iain (2002) BEAline to the Islands.  Kea Publishing. 
 Nicol, Christopher (2012) Eric Linklater's Private Angelo and The Dark of Summer Glasgow: ASLS 
 Rendall, Jocelyn (2009) Steering the Stone Ships: The Story of Orkney Kirks and People Saint Andrew Press, Edinburgh. 
 Tait, Charles (2012) The Orkney Guide Book, Charles Tait, St. Ola, Orkney. 
 Warner, Guy (2005) Orkney by Air. Kea Publishing. 
 Dance, Gaia (2013) "The Sea Before Breakfast." Amazon.

External links

 Orkney Islands Council, the local authority website
 Vision of Britain – Groome Gazetteer entry for Orkney
 Orkney Landscapes
 Map of the community council areas
 Map of civil parishes
 A Checklist of the Flora of Orkney, 2013

 
Northern Isles
Archipelagoes of Scotland
Archipelagoes of the Atlantic Ocean
Lieutenancy areas of Scotland
Counties of Scotland
Highlands and Islands of Scotland
Regions of Scotland
Former Norwegian colonies
Council areas of Scotland
Former Danish colonies
Kingdom of Norway (872–1397)

Renewable energy in Scotland
Counties of the United Kingdom (1801–1922)